Clarence L. Irving, Sr. (1924–2014) was an American cultural activist and mentor who made significant contributions to African-American history and heritage.

Life
Irving was born on August 21, 1924, in Prince George County, Virginia, and moved to New York City after completing his early education. His roots can be traced back to his great-great-great-great-great-grandfather who served as an assistant to William Claiborne, a surveyor in Jamestown, Virginia. His progenitor was one of the original twenty Africans who were dropped off by the Dutch in the 1620s and was selected by William Claiborne to be his helper when he was a teenager.

Irving worked as a mechanist at the U.S. Naval Yard from 1944 to 1953, and during this time, he also organized and coached youth baseball teams. He founded the Bisons in 1953, which became a successful team in the Brooklyn Kiwanis League. The Bisons won the New York State Kiwanis Baseball Senior Division Championship in 1955, with Irving as the first African American manager and coach to play at Doubleday Field in Cooperstown, New York,. Irving had a talent for coaching and was able to elevate the level of competition for the team, which was named after Howard University's team. The Bisons played their home games on Brooklyn's Parade Ground adjacent to Prospect Park, indicating the team's importance to the local community. In 1956 He left sandlot baseball and founded the Bison Athletic Club, which served as a mentorship program for young people in the Jamaica, Queens community. Through the club, Irving worked to promote physical fitness, discipline, and academic achievement among young people, while also providing them with positive role models and a supportive community.

Cultural archivist
 Irving's interest in stamps and advocacy for greater representation of African Americans through postage stamps led to his proposal for a stamp honoring a prominent black woman in 1975. This proposal, along with others, helped to raise awareness of the need for greater diversity in U.S. postage stamps. However, the first stamp in the Black Heritage Series was not actually issued until 1978, featuring Harriet Tubman.

In 1975 Irving prepared a pamphlet called the "Black American Heritage Trail" in preparation for the United States Bicentennial in 1976 for York College. The pamphlet documents a historical journey through St. Albans and Jamaica, highlighting the locations of significant black American heritage sites, including the location of the first black settlement and the home of Count Basie. In 1984, he founded the Black American Heritage Foundation (BAHF) He founded the Music History Archive in 1989, which serves as a repository for artifacts related to musicians.

Honors

Irving received several awards, including the 1999 Carter G. Woodson Award and the 2000 Humanitarian Award from Omega Psi Phi Fraternity, Inc. In 2007, the U.S. House of Representatives renamed the U.S. Postal Service Office in Jamaica, New York the "Clarence L. Irving, Sr. Post Office Building" in his honor.

Death
He retired from Con Ed where he had worked for 32 years. Irving died in March 2014 at the age of 90.

See also
 Archives of African American Music and Culture

References

External links
Archives of African American Music and Culture

African-American activists
1924 births
2014 deaths
People from Prince George County, Virginia
African-American men